Zvi Pinkas (born 1 September 1910, date of death unknown) was an Israeli sports shooter. He competed in two events at the 1952 Summer Olympics.

References

1910 births
Year of death missing
Israeli male sport shooters
Olympic shooters of Israel
Shooters at the 1952 Summer Olympics
Place of birth missing